Watermark is the third solo studio album by Art Garfunkel, originally released in October 1977 on Columbia Records. The first single, "Crying in My Sleep", failed to chart, but the follow-up, a version of "(What a) Wonderful World" (featuring harmony vocals from Garfunkel's old partner Paul Simon and mutual friend James Taylor) reached #17 on the Billboard Hot 100 chart and #1 on the Adult Contemporary chart. The songs "Watermark" and "Paper Chase" had previously been performed by Richard Harris on his albums A Tramp Shining and The Yard Went On Forever.  Watermark is also noted as being the final recording sessions of legendary saxophonist Paul Desmond who died of lung cancer shortly thereafter. Actress Laurie Bird, Garfunkel's girlfriend, made the album cover's photograph.  Some promotional copies of the single "Crying in My Sleep", released in advance of the album, referred to the album as Art Garfunkel, suggesting Garfunkel initially planned for the album to be self-titled.

Track listing 
All tracks composed by Jimmy Webb; except where indicated
Side one
"Crying in My Sleep" – 4:06
"Marionette" – 2:36
"Shine It on Me" – 3:26
"Watermark" – 2:59
"Saturday Suit" – 3:16
"All My Love's Laughter" – 3:56
Side two
"(What a) Wonderful World" (Herb Alpert, Sam Cooke, Lou Adler) – 3:32 (added to the January 1978 reissue, replacing the song "Fingerpaint")
"Mr. Shuck'n Jive" – 4:48
"Paper Chase" – 2:37
"She Moved Through the Fair" (Traditional) – 2:45
"Someone Else (1958)" – 2:19
"Fingerpaint" - 3:55 (removed from the January 1978 reissue, replaced with ("What a) Wonderful World")
"Wooden Planes" – 3:13

Personnel
 Art Garfunkel – vocals
 Paul Simon – acoustic guitar, Lead & background vocals on "(What a) Wonderful World"
 James Taylor - acoustic guitar, Lead & background vocals on "(What a) Wonderful World"
 Stephen Bishop – guitar, background vocals
 Derek Bell – harmonica
 Carol Flamm, Alexandra Stavrou, Ed Hasselbrink, Shelley Hirsch, Fred Farell, David Crosby, Bob Dorough, Leah Kunkel – background vocals
 Jay Clayton Voice Group - background vocals
 Paul Desmond – alto saxophone
 Pete Carr, Jimmy Johnson, Hugh McCracken – guitar
 Tommy Vig – vibraphone, background vocals
 Ralph MacDonald, Tom Roady, Craig Krampf – percussion
 Jimmy Webb – keyboards
 Barry Beckett – piano
 David Campbell – arranger
 Christopher Dedrick – arranger
 Joe Farrell – flute, English horn, oboe
 Martin Fay, Seán Keane – fiddle
 Jimmie Haskell – arranger
 Roger Hawkins, Steve Gadd, Rick Shlosser – drums
 David Hood, Joe Osborn, Tony Levin – bass guitar
 Thomas Latondre – percussion, handclaps
 Paddy Moloney – uilleann pipes, tin whistle
 Oklahoma Uni Chorale – background vocals
 Bill Payne – synthesizer
 Jack Schroer – saxophone
 Richard Tee – piano, Fender Rhodes
 Michael Tubridy – flute

Charts

Weekly charts

Year-end charts

Certifications

References

1977 albums
Art Garfunkel albums
Albums arranged by David Campbell (composer)
Albums produced by Phil Ramone
Columbia Records albums
Albums produced by Art Garfunkel
Albums recorded at Muscle Shoals Sound Studio